The Egtved Runestone or DR 37 is a Viking Age runestone engraved in Old Norse with the Younger Futhark runic alphabet. It was discovered in 1863, by a master mason named Anders Nielsen from Starup, in the southern part of the cemetery of Egtved church. It is dated to the period 900–1020. The stone is in granite and measures 80 cm in height, 55 cm in width and 43 cm in thickness. The style of the runestone is the runestone style RAK.

In an article Lis Jacobsen (Jacobsen 1935: 185–94) discussed possible interpretations that were not included in the standard work Danmarks Runeindskrifter 1941-42. She pointed out that the phrase "brōðiʀ æft brōður" and "stæinn sāsi" connect the inscription to a group of warrior band inscriptions, i.e. the Hällestad Runestones and the Sjörup Runestone, which are connected  to the Jomsvikings and the legendary Battle of the Fýrisvellir in Uppland, Sweden. However, the inscription is challenging to read and Jacobsen's interpretation is rather uncertain. Jacobsen suggests that the runes suiu refer to the location Svia in Vaksala parish, Uppland, Sweden; an interpretation that is contested (Peterson 2007: 321). However, the Scandinavian Runic-text Database accepts Jacobsen's analysis and does not add a question mark to it, as can be seen below.

Inscription
Transliteration of the runes into Latin characters

 ... ... ...at ' fai(n) ['] (t)u ÷ i suiu ' raist ¶ ... ...uþiʀ ' aft ' bruþur ¶ stain ' sasi ' skarni ' ...

Old Norse transcription:

 

English translation:

 "... ... ... (the) Coloured, (who) died in Svía. Raised ... brother in memory of brother. This stone ... ... "

See also
List of runestones

References

Sources
Enoksen, Lars Magnar. (1998). Runor : historia, tydning, tolkning. Historiska Media, Falun. 
Jacobsen, Lis (1935): Syv runestenstolkninger Aarbøger for Nordisk Oldkyndighed og Historie 1935 p. 167-224. København

Runestones in Denmark
Runestones in memory of Viking warriors
Jomsvikings